The St. Petersburg paradox or St. Petersburg lottery is a paradox involving the game of flipping a coin where the expected payoff of the theoretical lottery game approaches infinity but nevertheless seems to be worth only a very small amount to the participants. The St. Petersburg paradox is a situation where a naive decision criterion that takes only the expected value into account predicts a course of action that presumably no actual person would be willing to take. Several resolutions to the paradox have been proposed.

The problem was invented by Nicolas Bernoulli, who stated it in a letter to Pierre Raymond de Montmort on September 9, 1713. However, the paradox takes its name from its analysis by Nicolas' cousin Daniel Bernoulli, one-time resident of the eponymous Russian city, who in 1738 published his thoughts about the problem in the Commentaries of the Imperial Academy of Science of Saint Petersburg.

The St. Petersburg game 

A casino offers a game of chance for a single player in which a fair coin is tossed at each stage. The initial stake begins at 2 dollars and is doubled every time heads appears. The first time tails appears, the game ends and the player wins whatever is the current stake. Thus the player wins 2 dollars if tails appears on the first toss, 4 dollars if heads appears on the first toss and tails on the second, 8 dollars if heads appears on the first two tosses and tails on the third, and so on. Mathematically, the player wins  dollars, where  is the number of consecutive head tosses. What would be a fair price to pay the casino for entering the game?

To answer this, one needs to consider what would be the expected payout at each stage: with probability , the player wins 2 dollars; with probability  the player wins 4 dollars; with probability  the player wins 8 dollars, and so on. Assuming the game can continue as long as the coin toss results in heads and, in particular, that the casino has unlimited resources, the expected value is thus

Assuming the game can continue indefinitely, this sum grows without bound, and so the expected win is an infinite amount of money. However each dollar increment in the player's expected winnings require the casino's bankroll to be twice as large.

The paradox 
Considering nothing but the expected value of the net change in one's monetary wealth, one should therefore play the game at any price if offered the opportunity. Yet, Daniel Bernoulli, after describing the game with an initial stake of one ducat, stated, "Although the standard calculation shows that the value of [the player's] expectation is infinitely great, it has ... to be admitted that any fairly reasonable man would sell his chance, with great pleasure, for twenty ducats." Robert Martin quotes Ian Hacking as saying, "Few of us would pay even $25 to enter such a game", and he says most commentators would agree. The apparent paradox is the discrepancy between what people seem willing to pay to enter the game and the infinite expected value. The St. Petersburg paradox is a veridical paradox but not a contradiction, as no false statement is derived. It is often presented as a counterexample against the principle of maximizing the expected value, although it depends on the unrealistic assumption of a casino with infinite bankroll.

Solutions 
Several approaches have been proposed for solving the paradox.

Expected utility theory 

The classical resolution of the paradox involved the explicit introduction of a utility function, an expected utility hypothesis, and the presumption of diminishing marginal utility of money.

Daniel Bernoulli;

A common utility model, suggested by Daniel Bernoulli, is the logarithmic function  (known as log utility). It is a function of the gambler's total wealth , and the concept of diminishing marginal utility of money is built into it. The expected utility hypothesis posits that a utility function exists that provides a good criterion for real people's behavior; i.e. a function that returns a positive or negative value indicating if the wager is a good gamble. For each possible event, the change in utility  will be weighted by the probability of that event occurring. Let  be the cost charged to enter the game. The expected incremental utility of the lottery now converges to a finite value:

This formula gives an implicit relationship between the gambler's wealth and how much he should be willing to pay (specifically, any  that gives a positive change in expected utility). For example, with natural log utility, a millionaire ($1,000,000) should be willing to pay up to $20.88, a person with $1,000 should pay up to $10.95, a person with $2 should borrow $1.35 and pay up to $3.35.

Before Daniel Bernoulli published, in 1728, a mathematician from Geneva, Gabriel Cramer, had already found parts of this idea (also motivated by the St. Petersburg paradox) in stating that

He demonstrated in a letter to Nicolas Bernoulli that a square root function describing the diminishing marginal benefit of gains can resolve the problem. However, unlike Daniel Bernoulli, he did not consider the total wealth of a person, but only the gain by the lottery.

This solution by Cramer and Bernoulli, however, is not completely satisfying, as the lottery can easily be changed in a way such that the paradox reappears. To this aim, we just need to change the game so that it gives even more rapidly increasing payoffs. For any unbounded utility function, one can find a lottery that allows for a variant of the St. Petersburg paradox, as was first pointed out by Menger.

Recently, expected utility theory has been extended to arrive at more behavioral decision models. In some of these new theories, as in cumulative prospect theory, the St. Petersburg paradox again appears in certain cases, even when the utility function is concave, but not if it is bounded.

Probability weighting 
Nicolas Bernoulli himself proposed an alternative idea for solving the paradox. He conjectured that people will neglect unlikely events. Since in the St. Petersburg lottery only unlikely events yield the high prizes that lead to an infinite expected value, this could resolve the paradox. The idea of probability weighting resurfaced much later in the work on prospect theory by Daniel Kahneman and Amos Tversky. Paul Weirich similarly wrote that risk aversion could solve the paradox. Weirich went on to write that increasing the prize actually decreases the chance of someone paying to play the game, stating "there is some number of birds in hand worth more than any number of birds in the bush". However, this has been rejected by some theorists because, as they point out, some people enjoy the risk of gambling and because it is illogical to assume that increasing the prize will lead to more risks.

Cumulative prospect theory is one popular generalization of expected utility theory that can predict many behavioral regularities. However, the overweighting of small probability events introduced in cumulative prospect theory may restore the St. Petersburg paradox. Cumulative prospect theory avoids the St. Petersburg paradox only when the power coefficient of the utility function is lower than the power coefficient of the probability weighting function. Intuitively, the utility function must not simply be concave, but it must be concave relative to the probability weighting function to avoid the St. Petersburg paradox. One can argue that the formulas for the prospect theory are obtained in the region of less than $400. This is not applicable for infinitely increasing sums in the St. Petersburg paradox.

Finite St. Petersburg lotteries 
The classical St. Petersburg game assumes that the casino or banker has infinite resources. This assumption has long been challenged as unrealistic. Alexis Fontaine des Bertins pointed out in 1754 that the resources of any potential backer of the game are finite. More importantly, the expected value of the game only grows logarithmically with the resources of the casino. As a result, the expected value of the game, even when played against a casino with the largest bankroll realistically conceivable, is quite modest. In 1777, Georges-Louis Leclerc, Comte de Buffon calculated that after 29 rounds of play there would not be enough money in the Kingdom of France to cover the bet.

If the casino has finite resources, the game must end once those resources are exhausted. Suppose the total resources (or maximum jackpot) of the casino are W dollars (more generally, W is measured in units of half the game's initial stake). Assuming the game ends when the casino can no longer cover the bet, the expected value E of the lottery then becomes:

The following table shows the expected value E of the game with various potential bankers and their bankroll W:

Note: Under game rules which specify that if the player wins more than the casino's bankroll they will be paid all the casino has, the additional expected value is less than it would be if the casino had enough funds to cover one more round, i.e. less than $1. For the player to win  he must be allowed to play round .

The premise of infinite resources produces a variety of apparent paradoxes in economics. In the martingale betting system, a gambler betting on a tossed coin doubles his bet after every loss so that an eventual win would cover all losses; this system fails with any finite bankroll. The gambler's ruin concept shows that a persistent gambler who raises his bet to a fixed fraction of his bankroll when he wins, but does not reduce his bet when he loses, will eventually and inevitably go broke—even if the game has a positive expected value.

Ignore events with small probability 
Buffon argued that a theory of rational behavior must correspond to what a rational decision-maker would do in real life, and since reasonable people regularly ignore events that are unlikely enough, a rational decision-maker should also ignore such rare events. 

As an estimate of the threshold of ignorability, he argued that, since a 56-year-old man ignores the possibility of dying in the next 24 hours, which has a probability of 1/10189 according to the mortality tables, events with less than 1/10,000 probability could be ignored. Assuming that, the St Petersburg game has an expected payoff of only .

Rejection of mathematical expectation 
Various authors, including Jean le Rond d'Alembert and John Maynard Keynes, have rejected maximization of expectation (even of utility) as a proper rule of conduct. Keynes, in particular, insisted that the relative risk of an alternative could be sufficiently high to reject it even if its expectation were enormous. Recently, some researchers have suggested to replace the expected value by the median as the fair value.

Ergodicity 

Ergodicity economics rejects the use of mathematical expectation unless it can be justified by dynamic arguments. Ergodicity is a property which ensures that the expected value of a fluctuating quantity is also its long-time average. This property is believed to hold in equilibrium statistical mechanics, but it generally does not hold for models of personal wealth.

According to ergodicity economics, to find the price of St. Petersburg game, one computes the time-average growth rate of wealth which results from playing the lottery at a given price and wealth. The price where the time-average growth rate is zero for realistic dynamics is a realistic value for the maximum a player may be willing to pay. This is different from the growth experienced by the expected value for any dynamic which is not additive.

An early resolution containing the essential mathematical arguments assuming multiplicative dynamics was put forward in 1870 by William Allen Whitworth. An explicit link to the ergodicity problem was made by Peters in 2011. These solutions are mathematically similar to using the Kelly criterion or logarithmic utility. Conceptually, however, they are different because they emphasize the interpretation of expected value as an ensemble average and identify as a more relevant criterion the growth of the player's wealth as experienced over time. General dynamics beyond the purely multiplicative case can correspond to non-logarithmic utility functions, as was pointed out by Carr and Cherubini in 2020.

Recent discussions 
Although this paradox is three centuries old, new arguments have still been introduced in recent years.

Feller 
A solution involving sampling was offered by William Feller. Intuitively Feller's answer is "to perform this game with a large number of people and calculate the expected value from the sample extraction". In this method, when the games of infinite number of times are possible,  the expected value will be infinity, and in the case of finite, the expected value will be a much smaller value.

Samuelson 
Paul Samuelson resolves the paradox by arguing that, even if an entity had infinite resources, the game would never be offered. If the lottery represents an infinite expected gain to the player, then it also represents an infinite expected loss to the host. No one could be observed paying to play the game because it would never be offered. As Samuelson summarized the argument: "Paul will never be willing to give as much as Peter will demand for such a contract; and hence the indicated activity will take place at the equilibrium level of zero intensity."

Variants 
Many variants of the St Petersburg game are proposed to counter proposed solutions to the game. 

The expected utility from the game is then . However, since the sum is not absolutely convergent, it may be rearranged to sum to any number, including positive or negative infinity. This suggests that the expected utility of the Pasadena game depends on the summation order, but standard decision theory does not provide a principled way to choose a summation order.

See also 

 Ellsberg paradox
 Exponential growth
 Gambler's ruin
 Kelly criterion
 Martingale (betting system)
 Pascal's mugging
 Two envelopes problem
 Zeno's paradoxes

References

Notes

Further reading
 

(Chapter 4)

External links
 Online simulation of the St. Petersburg lottery

Paradoxes in economics
Behavioral finance
Mathematical economics
Probability theory paradoxes
Decision-making paradoxes
Coin flipping
Paradoxes of infinity